Scutacaridae is a family of mites belonging to the order Trombidiformes.

Genera

Genera:
 Arachnopes Ebermann, 1984
 Bruneipes Mahunka & Mahunka-Papp, 1992
 Diversipes Berlese, 1903

References

Trombidiformes